Frantz Hunt Coe (1856–1904) was a Seattle physician, public official and educator.

Coe was born November 28, 1856, in St. Charles, Illinois to Matthew Daniel Coe, M.D., and his wife Susan Farwell. He first attended the University of Michigan, where he graduated with an AB in 1879, and became a teacher. Shortly afterward, on August 17, 1880, he married Carrie Everett of Chelsea, Michigan.

With his father a physician, and not being quite satisfied on a teacher's salary, he went to medical school in 1884. (He is listed as a student in the Ann Arbor, Michigan address directory in 1886.) He graduated in 1888 with an M.D.

Coe and his wife promptly moved to Seattle, where in 1890 he is listed as partners with Gideon A. Weed "Physicians & Surgeons" at 606 Pike Street. A family researcher states that he was also surgeon for the Northern Pacific Railway and Seattle Traction Company and secretary of the Washington State Medical Society. He was Seattle's Public Health Officer in 1898.

"He wrote in his journal, 'I am absolutely satisfied women make better principals than men and wish to open up a new era in Seattle schools.'"

He served on the Seattle School Board from 1901 to 1904, his term ending with his death on July 16, 1904, in Seattle. Due to his prominence in the community and his enduring work for education, the Coe Elementary School was named after him in 1907.

Coe and his wife had two sons, Herbert and Harry, and one daughter, Francel (Frances?).

References 

Small bio and picture 
"Frantz Hunt Coe", by Richard Phipps in the Ancestry World Tree Project, hosted at Ancestry
Gardner Bartlett, Robert Coe Puritan His Ancestors and Descendants 1340-1910. Privately Printed. Boston, MA. 1911
Who Was Who in America. A component volume of Who's Who in American History. Volume 1, 1897-1942. Chicago: A.N. Marquis Co., 1943.
Charles W. (Charles Wesley) Smith, Isabel Mayhew . Pacific Northwest Americana. Binfords & Mort. 1950
University of Michigan. Board of Regents, Proceedings of the Board of Regents. The University 1915

1856 births
1904 deaths
People from St. Charles, Illinois
Physicians from Seattle
University of Michigan alumni
University of Michigan Medical School alumni